The longfin dace (Agosia chrysogaster)  is a leuciscid fish that is found in western North America in the United States and Mexico.  It is the only member of its genus. The Gila longfin dace is considered the nominate subspecies. The Yaqui longfin dace is considered a form.

References

Leuciscinae
Fish of North America
Fish described in 1856
Taxa named by Charles Frédéric Girard